Barrack Street is one of two major cross-streets in the central business district of Perth, Western Australia. Together with St Georges Terrace, Wellington Street and William Street it defines the boundary of the main shopping precinct of the central city.

Route description

Barrack Street commences at Barrack Street Jetty, and the adjacent Barrack Square.  Moving in an uphill direction away from the Swan River, it passes alongside the Supreme Court Gardens and the Stirling Gardens.  Crossing St Georges Terrace, Barrack Street then passes alongside the heritage-listed Treasury Buildings and the Perth Town Hall. The town hall location was regularly utilised for special occasions, including the royal visit in 1901, and the centenary of Western Australia celebrations in 1929.

Commercial buildings on the opposite side of the street give way to small retail businesses on both sides between Hay Street and Wellington Street.

The street terminates at Wellington Street, continuing as Beaufort Street on and over the Barrack Street Bridge, which crosses the Midland and Armadale railway lines. The Barrack Street Bridge was constructed in 1894.

History

Barrack Street existed as a named road as early as 1833. It was named for the military barracks that existed along the alignment, at the corner of St Georges Terrace, in 1829. Construction of the barracks began on 13 August 1829, the day after Governor Stirling declared the foundation of the town of Perth. Soon afterwards, the soldiers' quarters were established, along an alignment that formed the street.

The section between Murray Street and Wellington Street saw a minor urban renewal with Barrack Plaza officially opening on 12 July 2006.

Traffic direction
Barrack Street began as a two-way street.
In 2010, the section between Riverside Drive and The Esplanade returned to two-way traffic. Further conversion occurred in 2011; the section between The Esplanade and St Georges Terrace was changed back to two-way traffic, and on 29 November 2015 the section between St Georges Terrace and Wellington Street was converted.

Cathedral Square
With the evolution of the properties in the CBD block defined by Barrack Street, Hay Street, Pier Street and St Georges Terrace, Barrack Street has become the western boundary of the Cathedral Square precinct.  The renovation and revitalisation of the Perth Town Hall, and Treasury buildings has made the Barrack Street side a pedestrian entry point into the Square.

Major intersections

Barrack Street intersects all the major east-west routes in the Perth CBD. It is the northbound route of State Route 53 through the CBD. William Street, one block over to the west, carries the route southbound.
 Riverside Drive (State Route 5)
 The Esplanade (State Route 5)
 St Georges Terrace
 Hay Street east / Hay Street Mall west
 Murray Street east / Murry Street Mall west
 Wellington Street (State Route 65)
 Beaufort Street (State Route 53) – northern continuation beyond Wellington Street

See also 

 Elizabeth Quay

Notes 

 
Streets in Perth central business district, Western Australia